San José de Achuapa is a municipality in the León department of Nicaragua.

Municipalities of the León Department